Jonathan Buck was born in Woburn, Massachusetts on February 20, 1719, and raised in Haverhill, Massachusetts. He died March 18, 1795, in Bucksport, Maine. He is the founder of the town of Bucksport, having settled what was known as Plantation 1, building the first sawmill and opening the first general store.

Colonel Buck was a justice of the peace and is the subject of a legend that holds that he ordered a witch put to death by burning, and this witch put a curse on his tomb. There is a monument to Col. Buck erected in the Bucksport Cemetery in 1870 which bears a stain roughly in the shape of a woman's lower leg. According to the legend, the stain is the leg and foot of the witch, and that the mark has reappeared whenever the tombstone has been replaced.

Jonathan Buck left Haverhill when his request to build a shipyard on the Merrimack River was denied and instead he was offered privileges on a tributary on another side of his land. Since Buck did not own the land on the opposite side of the brook, he saw no ability to thrive as a shipbuilder in Haverhill.

In 1775 Buck was appointed by the Massachusetts Provincial Congress as Colonel in the 5th Regiment of the District of Maine Militia in Lincoln County and placed in charge of Fort Pownall located at the mouth of the Penobscot River. He was one of the leaders of the Penobscot Expedition in July–August, 1779, a major loss for the colonial forces. After this, Buck trekked back to Haverhill to be with his sons, and did not return to Maine until 1783.

References 

1719 births
1795 deaths